Zeuxine rolfeana is a deciduous terrestrial orchid belonging to the subfamily Orchidoideae. It is found in South Andaman Island.

References

rolfeana